One World Tour may refer to:

 One World Tour (The Cheetah Girls), a 2008 tour by The Cheetah Girls
 One World Tour (Ricky Martin), a 2015-2018 tour by Ricky Martin